The Summer Work Travel Program is a program founded and maintained by the United States Department of State, which determines the number of students that have a right to take part each year. The program works with private companies that register students into the program and help to provide information and get the necessary documents, including the J-1 visa. Some agencies also help program participants to plan their journey to their future place of work, giving the possibility of purchasing international airline tickets on students tariffs.

Program details

The Summer Work Travel Program is intended for students who wish to familiarize themselves with the culture of the United States and to work during their summer vacation. Terms of the program, work placement, conditions, and payment are arranged in advance of the trip. Upon completion, students are free to travel throughout the United States.

State Department conducts the necessary supervision and co-ordination of the program and determines the possible number of program participants annually.

Sponsors are US organizations approved by State Department to manage the Summer Work and Travel Program.

Overseas agencies recruit organizations that work closely with Sponsors to select the right students for the program.

Employer is a US company that offers jobs to the international students.

Participant to Summer Work and Travel Program is an International Student that comes to the United States for cultural exchange, work and travel period of 4 months.

The program uses SEVIS, a United States Government computerized system that collects and manages data about all international students and exchange visitors during their stays. SEVIS tells the U.S. government where students live, work, and their legal status during your program. Generic distribution information of program participants is publicly available on the J-1 visa website.

The program window varies by country to account for local differences in summer vacation duration and dates. Participants in the southern hemisphere participate during the winter in the United States.

Requirements
Summer Work and Travel students must be:
 Sufficiently proficient in English to successfully interact in an English speaking environment
 Post-secondary school students enrolled in and actively pursuing a degree or other full-time course of study at an accredited classroom based, post-secondary educational institution outside the United States
 Have successfully completed at least one semester or equivalent of post-secondary academic study
 Pre-placed in a job prior to entry unless from a visa waiver country

References

Student exchange